Schneeland (German: "Snowland") is a 2005 film written and directed by German filmmaker Hans W. Geissendörfer. Based on the novel Hohaj by Elisabeth Rynell, it depicts the devastation felt by Elizabeth (Maria Schrader), a woman who had lost her husband in a car crash and wants to leave her three young children to join him in death by wandering out into the snowy deserts of Lapland. As she wanders through the snow, Elizabeth discovers the story of Aron (Thomas Kretschmann) and Ina (Julia Jentsch), a couple who overcame dark secrets and over-controlling family members to be with each other.

Schneeland premiered in January 2005 at the Sundance Film Festival and was released nationwide in German later that month. At the Deutscher Filmpreis (German Film Awards) in 2005, it was nominated for four awards including Best Costume Design and Best Production Design. It won for Best Cinematography.

Cast
 Thomas Kretschmann - Aron
 Julia Jentsch - Ina
 Ulrich Mühe - Knövel
 Maria Schrader - Elisabeth
 Oliver Stokowski - Salomon
 Ina Weisse - Helga
 Joachim Król - Rubert

External links 
 
 Schneeland-derfilm.de– Official website (in English and German) 

2005 films
2005 romantic drama films
German romantic drama films
2000s German-language films
Films based on Swedish novels
Romantic period films
Films set in Sweden
Films directed by Hans W. Geißendörfer
2000s German films